Purushartham is a 1987 Indian Malayalam film, directed by K. R. Mohanan and produced by P. T. Kunjumuhammed. The film stars Adoor Bhasi, Sujata Mehta, Jain George and Madambu Kunjukuttan in the lead roles.
This film won Kerala State Film Award for Best Film and National Film Award for Best Feature Film in Malayalam in 1987.

Cast
Adoor Bhasi
Sujata Mehta
Jebin George
Madambu Kunjukuttan

References

External links
 

1986 films
1980s Malayalam-language films